The exceptio non adimpleti contractus is a defence that can be raised in the case of a reciprocal contract. In essence, it is a remedy that allows a party to withhold his own performance, accompanied by a right to ward off a claim for such performance until the other party has duly performed his or her obligations under the contract.

Requirements for the exceptio non adimpleti contractus
Two requirements must be met in order for the exceptio non adimpleti contractus to be available. The two performances must be reciprocal to one another; and the other party must be obliged to perform first.

Bibliography
Dale Hutchinson & Chris-James Pretorius. The Law of Contract in South Africa, 2nd edn. Cape Town: Oxford University Press, 2012.

References 

Contract law
Legal defenses